Ludwig Guttenbrunn (1750 – 15 January 1819) was an Austrian artist who worked in the latter part of the 18th century and early 19th century. He specialized in portraiture and history painting.

Life
Guttenbrunn was born either in Vienna, or in Krems (it is not known which). He studied painting under Martin Johann Schmidt. By 1770 he was working for the Esterházy family, where he painted portraits of the reigning prince, Nikolaus Esterházy, and possibly the portrait of Joseph Haydn seen and discussed below. He also created decorative paintings for Nikolaus's new palace at Esterháza.

By 1772 he had moved to Rome, where he had been sent to study by Prince Esterházy (he did not return to the Esterházy court, however). He continued to work as a portrait painter, later moving to Florence. He executed a self-portrait which hangs in the Uffizi Gallery in Florence.

In 1789 he moved to London. Shortly after arrival, or perhaps on the way, he produced the portrait of Marie Antoinette, Queen of France, shown below. According to Robbins Landon, Guttenbrunn was successful in London, and his "name is encountered frequently in the newspapers". Robbins Landon quotes an advertisement from the Morning Herald, 24 April 1794, which reads:

[Guttenbrunn's] Exhibition of Ancient and Modern Pictures, No. 4 Little Maddx-street four doors down from New Bond-street, is now open every day ... [Among the portraits is that of] the late Queen of France taken from life in the year 1789.

(The Queen had been guillotined by the revolutionary government the previous year.)

In 1795, on the recommendation of the Russian envoy in London, he moved to St. Peterburg, then later to Moscow. His portrait of Alexej Kurakin, shown below, dates from his stay in Russia.

He is known to have been in Dresden in 1806, then after 1807 back in Rome. Guttenbrunn's last attested painting dates from 1813.

Death
He died in Frankfurt am Main, 15 January 1819.

Guttenbrunn's portrait of Joseph Haydn
Guttenbrunn's portrait of Haydn, seen below, exists in two versions. It is possible that the first dates from his encounter with Haydn at the Esterházy court in the early 1770s, and the second from their encounter in London in the early 1790s. The second version is more detailed than the first, and was the basis for an engraving (1792) by Luigi Schiavonetti.

The portrait shows Haydn in the act of composing: he is seated at a keyboard, gazing into the distance, testing out notes with one hand and putting pen to paper with the other.

Gallery
These images may be viewed in larger size by clicking on them.

Notes

References
 Harrison, Bernard (1997) Haydn's keyboard music: studies in performance practice. Oxford: Oxford University Press. .
 Holzinger, Ernst and Hans-Joachim Ziemke (1972) Kataloge der Gemälde im Städelschen Kunstinstitut Frankfurt am Main. Vol. 1: Die Gemälde des 19. Jahrhunderts. Städtische Galerie im Städelschen Kunstinstitut, Frankfurt am Main. .
 Jenkins, Ian and Kim Sloan (1996) Vases & volcanoes: Sir William Hamilton and his collection. British Museum Press. .
 Robbins Landon, H. C. (1976) Haydn: Chronicle and Works, Vol. 3. Bloomington: Indiana University Press.
 Thieme, Ulrich, Felix Becker, Frederick Charles Willis, Hans Vollmer (1922) Allgemeines Lexikon der bildenden Künstler von der Antike bis zur Gegenwart, Volume 15, article "Ludwig Guttenbrunn". W. Engelmann. Available on Google Books.
 Zaslaw, Neal and William Cowdery (1990) The Compleat Mozart: a guide to the musical works of Wolfgang Amadeus Mozart. New York: W. W. Norton & Company. .

18th-century Austrian painters
18th-century Austrian male artists
Austrian male painters
19th-century Austrian painters
19th-century male artists
Joseph Haydn
Austrian expatriates in Hungary
Austrian expatriates in the United Kingdom
Austrian expatriates in Germany
Artists from Vienna
People from Krems an der Donau
1750 births
1819 deaths